Lawrence Auster (January 26, 1949 – March 29, 2013) was an American racialist, conservative essayist who wrote on immigration and multiculturalism.

Personal life
Auster grew up in New Jersey, and was a cousin of the novelist Paul Auster. He attended Columbia University for two years, later finishing a B.A. in English at the University of Colorado at Boulder. He never married, and was not - as has been claimed - a lawyer.

Born Jewish, Auster converted to Christianity as an adult and became a member of the Episcopal Church, a church he said he preferred "in the historical rather than the present tense", because the Church's ordination of openly gay men means "it has ceased being a Christian church". He died of pancreatic cancer in West Chester, Pennsylvania on March 29, 2013. Auster later converted to Roman Catholicism on his deathbed.

Writings
 
Auster was the author of several works on immigration and multiculturalism, most notably The Path to National Suicide, originally published by the American Immigration Control Foundation (AICF) in 1990.  The book calls for greater public debate about U.S. immigration policy and the "orthodoxy" that upholds it. In Alien Nation: Common Sense About America's Immigration Disaster, Peter Brimelow refers to Path as "perhaps the most remarkable literary product of the Restrictionist underground, a work which I think will one day be seen as a political pamphlet to rank with Tom Paine's Common Sense."  Professor Gabriel Chin has called Auster "the unsung godfather of the restrictionist movement".

Auster's work appeared in numerous publications, including National Review, FrontPage Magazine, Human Events, WorldNetDaily and The Social Contract.

Auster edited a daily blog, View from the Right (VFR). He took over editorship from writer James Kalb. Auster published his final post on March 24, 2013.

Political views
 

Auster identified his political views as traditionalist conservative. He opposed what he described as the liberalism of modern Western civilization. His interests were primarily social policy, particularly the politics of gender, sex, religion, sexuality, culture, patriotism, and identity. Auster described himself as profoundly alienated from modern America, and he considered most institutions of American society, including both political parties, to be corrupted by liberal philosophy.

Auster wrote, "I have always called myself a racialist, which to me means two things. First, as a general proposition, I think that race matters in all kinds of ways. Second, I care about the white race. It is the source of and is inseparable from everything we are, everything we have, and everything our civilization has achieved." He did not self-identify as a white nationalist. As a tactical matter, Auster accepted the conventional definition of racism as having "the connotation of the morally bad, of oppression and hatred."

The Southern Poverty Law Center (SPLC) implied that Auster was a racist because he spoke at an American Renaissance conference, delivering a speech entitled "Multiculturalism and the War Against White America." He was one of ten speakers to address the magazine's first conference in 1994, but did not speak there afterward. He criticized Jared Taylor for tolerating the former Klansman David Duke and Stormfront moderator Jamie Kelso, who attended the conference and asked questions. Auster still supported Taylor's personal views as well as those of the late Samuel T. Francis, another frequent speaker for the conferences.

Auster was an occasional contributor to FrontPage Magazine until 2007 when the publication cut its ties with Auster over an article he wrote in which he complained that "each story of black on white rape is reported in isolation, not presented as part of a larger pattern" and that "white women in this country are being targeted by black rapists". Responding to his exclusion from FrontPage Magazine, Auster claimed that editor David Horowitz had "behaved in the most outrageously politically correct manner I've ever seen in my life."

References

External links
Auster's blog

1949 births
2013 deaths
20th-century essayists
21st-century essayists
Anti-immigration activists
American male bloggers
American bloggers
American male essayists
American people of Polish-Jewish descent
Anglican writers
Deaths from cancer in Pennsylvania
Columbia University alumni
Converts to Anglicanism from Judaism
Critics of multiculturalism
Deaths from pancreatic cancer
Human Events people
Jewish American writers
National Review people
University of Colorado Boulder alumni
Writers from New Jersey
20th-century American male writers
21st-century American male writers
20th-century American non-fiction writers
21st-century American non-fiction writers
21st-century American Jews